Alirio Napoleón Macías was a Roman Catholic priest in El Salvador who was assassinated on 4 August 1979. He served under Archbishop Óscar Arnulfo Romero y Galdámez. His murder was characterized by Romero as part of a systematic persecution of the Catholic Church and oppression against efforts to reform a military dictatorship there to guaranty human rights for the poor masses.

References

1979 deaths
Assassinated Salvadoran people
20th-century Salvadoran Roman Catholic priests
People murdered in El Salvador
Year of birth missing
20th-century Roman Catholic martyrs
Catholic martyrs of El Salvador
1979 crimes in El Salvador
1979 murders in North America
1970s murders in El Salvador